We Know You Know is the third album by Montreal based group Lesbians On Ecstasy. It contains 10 songs and is the follow-up album to 2005 remix album Giggles in the Dark

The song Sisters in the Struggle reached #1 on the CBC Radio 3 chart show R3-30 for the week of June 28, 2007.

Track listing
 "Sisters in the Struggle" – 5:13 	
 "Sedition" – 4:25
 "The Cold Touch of Leather" –	3:11	
 "Victoria's Secret" – 3:24	
 "We Won't Give it Back" – 4:24
 "Party Time (a womyn's luv)" – 3:53	
 "Is this the Way?" – 3:52	
 "Alone in the Madness" – 5:13 	
 "It's Practically Freedom" – 3:43	
 "Mortified" – 3:26

External links
Alien8 Recordings – Record company review of the album.

2007 albums
Lesbians on Ecstasy albums
Alien8 Recordings albums